Ersin Zehir (born 15 January 1998) is a German-Turkish professional footballer who plays as a midfielder for Eintracht Trier.

Career

FC St. Pauli
In June 2021, after his return from a loan at 3. Liga club VfB Lübeck, Zehir agreed the termination of his contract with FC St. Pauli. He made 21 appearances in the 2. Bundesliga for FC St. Pauli.

Antalyaspor
Following his departure from FC St. Pauli, Zehir moved to Antalyaspor. He made his debut for the club in a Turkish Cup win over Diyarbakırspor on 28 October 2021, coming on as a half-time substitute for Fyodor Kudryashov in a 5–0 win. His league debut followed on 6 November in a 1–0 victory against Altay, coming off the bench in injury time.

Loan to Dordrecht
He joined Dutch side FC Dordrecht, placed last in the Eerste Divisie, on loan in January 2022. He signed a contract until the end of the 2021–22 season with the option of a further season. Zehin made his Dordrecht debut in a 2–0 victory against Jong AZ. In his second match on 21 January, he scored his first goal in 4–0 win at Jong FC Utrecht; a hard shot in the top corner.

Eintracht Trier
On 20 January 2023, Zehir signed for Regionalliga Südwest club Eintracht Trier on a contract until the end of the season.

References

1998 births
Living people
German people of Turkish descent
Sportspeople from Lübeck
Footballers from Schleswig-Holstein
German footballers
Association football midfielders
FC St. Pauli II players
FC St. Pauli players
VfB Lübeck players
Antalyaspor footballers
FC Dordrecht players
Tuzlaspor players
SV Eintracht Trier 05 players
2. Bundesliga players
Regionalliga players
3. Liga players
Süper Lig players
Eerste Divisie players
German expatriate footballers
German expatriate sportspeople in Turkey
Expatriate footballers in Turkey
German expatriate sportspeople in the Netherlands
Expatriate footballers in the Netherlands